The Remington Model 887 Nitro Mag is a pump-action shotgun manufactured by Remington Arms Company, Inc. It is noted for using a polymer finish called ArmorLokt, which is designed to survive any type of weather condition and leaves no exterior surfaces to rust. This gives the 887 a "space age" look which is one of the gun's more defining features.

Design and Features
As the name suggests, the 887 Nitro Mag can chamber 3 ½″ magnum shells. In this way, it competes with the Mossberg 835 Ulti-Mag, which is designed specifically for firing 3 ½″ magnum shells. The look of the 887 is also frequently compared to that of the Benelli Nova. The Remington 887's brochure confirms this by comparing itself to the Mossberg 835 and the Benelli Nova.

ArmorLokt Finish
The 887's most striking feature is the ArmorLokt finish. The entire receiver and barrel of the 887 is coated with a glass-filled nylon material which protects the steel interior of the gun. In this way, the steel provides the strength for the gun while the polymer protects the inner workings from the elements, including inclement weather and resulting corrosion. Manufacturers have come up with several ways to help protect a gun's metal surface, but overmolding the gun with a polymer is a unique concept.

Remington claims that the ArmorLokt finish is impenetrable, and has several tests to help back up this claim. Company engineers subjected the 887 to salt-corrosion and submersion tests and checked for leaks and separation in the polymer, and none were found. A second test was conducted, where over 10,000 rounds were discharged through a single 887 barrel, and the barrel's coating showed no signs of separation. Smaller tests have been conducted by reviewers which somewhat verify these results.

Several key parts of the weapon are not treated with the ArmorLokt process. Noted on several sites are issues with the fore end tube assembly having rust directly from the factory.

The surface of the barrel, receiver, and synthetic fore-end has a tire-tread pattern to make a non-slip surface. It also gives the gun a unique look, which is often criticized.

Remington's Recall

Remington is doing a voluntary recall on all Model 887 shotguns manufactured between Dec. 1, 2013 and Nov. 24, 2014 for safety reasons. Remington flagged these guns over a defect that might bind the firing pin to the forward position. If a round is chambered with the firing pin locked forward it's possible the shotgun may fire, resulting in an unintentional discharge.

Remington will continue production of Model 887 shotguns as the issue isn't inherent to the 887 design itself, just some flawed components that were put into production firearms. Every shotgun that has been inspected will be punch-marked on the bolt to indicate that the guns have been returned, checked, repaired if necessary and test-fired to ensure they are up to 100 percent.

Remington Model 870 Comparison

The core design, specifically, the receiver and the barrel, is based upon that of the famous Remington 870, although the 887 employs a significantly redesigned action, with rotating bolt-head locking lugs in lieu of the single lifting lug used in the 870. These make up the steel "core" of the 887. However, besides this, the 887 actually differs fairly significantly from the 870, and is not designed to replace the 870.

The 887 offers several improvements over the 870's design, usually in the name of user-friendliness. The slide release, for example, is a large, triangular button located on the top half of the trigger guard's face which is easy to use, even with gloves on or with numb hands. This is in contrast to the 870, where the slide release is a small metal tab located to the left of the trigger guard.

Variations

Remington was initially marketing two versions of the 887, the 887 Nitro Mag and the 887 Nitro Mag Waterfowl. Remington has released several new models including 887 Nitro Mag Tactical, 887 Nitro Mag Bone Collector, and 887 Nitro Mag Camo Combo.

The Tactical model is similar to the base model, but with an 18.5 inch barrel, a magazine extension tube, and 2 Picatinny mounting rails. The 887 Nitro Mag Waterfowl is very similar to the base version, with the main difference being the finish. The waterfowl version includes a finish covered in Mossy Oak's Break-Up Infinity and also Realtree Advantage Max-4 HD camo, which makes it ideal for hunting, as per its namesake. The 887 Waterfowl is also slightly heavier than the 887.

Users

 : Used by Serbian Gendarmerie.

See also
 Remington Model 10
 Remington 870
 Mossberg 835 Ulti-Mag
 Benelli Nova

Notes

Remington Arms firearms
Pump-action shotguns